Placenta-specific protein 1 is a small (212 amino acid), secreted cell surface protein encoded on the X-chromosome by the PLAC1 gene.  Since its discovery in 1999, PLAC1 has been found to play a role in placental development and maintenance, several gestational disorders including preeclampsia , fetal development and a large number of cancers.

Genomics 
PLAC1 is located on the long arm of the X-chromosome at Xq26.3. The gene consists of six Exons spanning nearly 200Kb (GRCh38/hgs38; X:134,565,838 - 134,764,322). The entire coding sequence plus the 3’ UTR and part of the 5’ UTR constitute Exon 6 while Exons 1 – 5 contain variously spliced elements of the rest of the 5’UTR including two independently regulated promoters. 

These two promoters, termed P1 (or distal) and P2 (or proximal) are located in Exons 1 and 4 respectively. They have been shown to produce transcripts simultaneously though P1 transcription predominates in cancers and P2 transcription predominates in placentae[7].

Phylogenetics 
From its initial description, the consensus is that PLAC1 is highly conserved and that this conservation reflects an important role in the establishment and maintenance of the placenta[8]. A detailed study of the PLAC1 gene and protein among 54 placental mammal species representing twelve crown orders confirms a high level of conservation under the control of strict purifying selection[9]. Further, comparative genomic sequences from two marsupials, the opossum (Mondelphis domestica) and the wallaby (Macropus eugenii), a monotreme, the platypus (Ornithorhynchus anatinus), two avians, the chicken (Gallus gallus) and the finch (Taeniopygia guttata), and two fish, the zebrafish (Danio rerio) and the stickleback (Gasterosteus arculeatus)  spanning the synthenic X-chromosome region from PHD finger protein 6 (PHD6) through Factor 9 (F9) were screened for any sequences similar to PLAC1. The screen showed that PLAC1 appeared in the animal genome concurrent with the emergence of the Placentalia some 165,000,000 years ago[10].

Function 
Discovery of PLAC1 resulted from an examination of the region around the human hypoxanthine ribosyltransferase 1 (HPRT) gene aimed at determining whether or not a placenta-specific protein was encoded there. This question was raised because the region was believed to be involved in both placental and fetal pathologies. Once identified, PLAC1 and its mouse ortholog Plac1 were found to be expressed throughout gestation[11,12]. It was quickly established that PLAC1 expression is specific to trophoblast cells and that it is a critical element in establishing and maintaining a normal placenta. Expression was further localised to the apical region of the syncytiotrophoblast, the leading, invasive part of the developing embryo[13]. PLAC1 expression terminates at the onset of labor and PLAC1 mRNAs clear the peripheral maternal circulatory system soon after delivery[14-16].

Recognition that PLAC1 plays an important role in first establishing the placenta and, subsequently, in maintaining it throughout gestation leads to the idea that PLAC1 may play a role in gestational issues from infertility to premature birth. An important contribution to this idea is the observation that a Plac1 knockout mouse model exhibited both placentomegaly in the dams and growth restriction in the pups[8,17]. Numerous human gestational issues have been associated with abnormal PLAC1 expression including intrauterine growth restriction (IUGR)[18-20], premature birth[21,22], implantation failure[23–26], and preeclampsia[27-33]. Several of these studies have sought to develop PLAC1 assays into diagnostic tools with mixed success.

Cancer 
While it has been clearly established that PLAC1 is truly placenta-specific, almost from the outset it was also clear that PLAC1 is co-opted in human cancers. The first evidence that PLAC1 is co-opted in cancer was published in 2006[34]. Since then, PLAC1 expression has been demonstrated in more than a dozen human cancers and in at least one hundred human cancer cell lines. Among the cancers in which PLAC1 expression is evident are gastric cancers[35-37], colon/colorectal cancers[37-39], liver cancers[40,41], pancreatic cancers[42], lung cancers[43], and breast cancers[44-49]. In nearly all cases, PLAC1 expression is associated with poor clinical outcomes. Nowhere is this more true than in cancers of the male and female reproductive tract. That is, prostate cancer[50,51], uterine cancer[52], ovarian cancer[53,54] and cervical cancer[55] all have demonstrated a positive correlation between PLAC1 expression and prognosis.

In 2005, PLAC1 expression in differentiating fibroblasts was shown to be regulated by fibroblast growth factor 7 (FGF7)[56]. This regulatory relationship has since been shown to be central to Akt Serine/Threonine kinase 1-mediated cancer cell proliferation[57]. PLAC1 forms a cell surface complex with FGF7 and the FGFR2IIIb receptor which then activates a cascade leading to Akt phosphorylation. Expression of PLAC1is, in turn, partially determined by the p53 tumor suppressor[58]. PLAC1 expression is suppressed by wild-type p53 but increases in the presence of mutated or absent p53[54].

Immunotherapy 
PLAC1 is classified as a “cancer-testis antigen” as it is preferentially expressed in trophoblasts and tumors. In addition to results associating PLAC1 expression with risk of various cancers as well as with prognosis, the ability of PLAC1 to elicit an immune response suggests that its specificity could be harnessed therapeutically. One group in particular is pioneering the potential[59]. Using anti-PLAC1/drug conjugates they have shown that PLAC1-based immunotherapy is highly promising[50, 51].

References
[7] Chen Y, Moradin A, Schlessinger D, Nagaraja R. 2011  RXRα and LXR activate two promoters in placenta- and tumor-specific expression of PLAC1. Placenta. Nov;32(11):877-84. doi: 10.1016/j.placenta. 

[8] Jackman SM, Kong X, Fant ME. 2012  Plac1 (placenta-specific 1) is essential for normal placental and embryonic development. Mol Reprod Dev. Aug;79(8):564-72. doi: 10.1002/mrd.22062. 

[9] Devor EJ. 2014  Placenta-specific protein 1 is conserved throughout the Placentalia under purifying selection. ScientificWorldJournal. 2014:537356. doi: 10.1155/2014/537356.  Free PMC article.

[10] Devor, EJ 2016  Placenta-specific protein 1 (PLAC1) is a unique onco-fetal-placental protein and an underappreciated therapeutic target in cancer. Integrative Cancer Sci Ther. 3: 479-483.

[11] Chang WL, Wang H, Cui L, Peng NN, Fan X, Xue LQ, Yang Q.  2016  PLAC1 is involved in human trophoblast syncytialization. Reprod Biol. Sep;16(3):218-224. doi: 10.1016/j.repbio.2016.07.001. 

[12] Massabbal E, Parveen S, Weisoly DL, Nelson DM, Smith SD, Fant M.  2005  PLAC1 expression increases during trophoblast differentiation: evidence for regulatory interactions with the fibroblast growth factor-7 (FGF-7) axis. Mol Reprod Dev. Jul;71(3):299-304.

[13] Chang WL, Yang Q, Zhang H, Lin HY, Zhou Z, Lu X, Zhu C, Xue LQ, Wang H.   2014  Role of placenta-specific protein 1 in trophoblast invasion and migration. Reproduction. Oct;148(4):343-52. doi: 10.1530/REP-14-0052. 

[14] Fant M, Weisoly DL, Cocchia M, Huber R, Khan S, Lunt T, Schlessinger D.  2002  PLAC1, a trophoblast-specific gene, is expressed throughout pregnancy in the human placenta and modulated by keratinocyte growth factor. Mol Reprod Dev. Dec;63(4):430-6. 

[15] Rawn SM, Cross JC.  2008  The evolution, regulation, and function of placenta-specific genes. Annu Rev Cell Dev Biol. 2008;24:159-81. doi:10.1146/annurev.cellbio.24.110707.175418. 

[16] Concu M, Banzola I, Farina A, Sekizawa A, Rizzo N, Marini M, Caramelli E, Carinci P. Rapid clearance of mRNA for PLAC1 gene in maternal blood after delivery. Fetal Diagn Ther. 2005 Jan-Feb;20(1):27-30. 

[17] Fant ME, Fuentes J, Kong X, Jackman S.  2014 The Nexus of Prematurity, Birth Defects, and Intrauterine Growth Restriction: A Role for PLAC1-Regulated Pathways. Front Pediatr. Feb 21;2:8. eCollection 2014. Review. 

[18] Deyssenroth MA, Li Q, Lacasaña M, Nomura Y, Marsit C, Chen J. 2017  Expression of placental regulatory genes is associated with fetal growth.

J Perinat Med. Oct 26;45(7):887-893. doi: 10.1515/jpm-2017-0064. 

[19] Sifakis S, Androutsopoulos VP, Pontikaki A, Velegrakis A, Papaioannou GI, Koukoura O, Spandidos DA, Papantoniou N. 2018  Placental expression of PAPPA, PAPPA-2 and PLAC-1 in pregnancies is associated with FGR. Mol Med Rep. May;17(5):6435-6440. doi: 10.3892/mmr.2018.8721. 

[20] Ibanoglu MC, Ozgu-Erdinc AS, Kara O, Topcu HO, Uygur D.   2019  Association of Higher Maternal Serum Levels of Plac1 Protein with Intrauterine Growth Restriction. Z Geburtshilfe Neonatol. Oct;223(5):285-288. doi: 10.1055/a-0743-7403. 

[21] Farina A, Rizzo N, Concu M, Banzola I, Sekizawa A, Grotti S, Carinci P.   2004  Lower maternal PLAC1 mRNA in pregnancies complicated with vaginal bleeding (threatened abortion <20 weeks) and a surviving fetus. Clin Chem. Jan;51(1):224-7. doi: 10.1373/clinchem.2004.041228. 

[22] Rizzo N, Banzola I, Concu M, Morano D, Sekizawa A, Giommi F, Vagnoni S, Gabrielli S, Tempesta A, Carinci P, Farina A. 2006  PLAC1 mRNA levels in maternal blood at induction of labor correlate negatively with induction-delivery interval. Eur J Obstet Gynecol Reprod Biol. Jun;132(2):177-81. 

[23] Kotto-Kome AC, Silva C, Whiteman V, Kong X, Fant ME   2011  Circulating anti-PLAC1 antibodies during pregnancy and in women with reproductive failure: A preliminary analysis. ISRN Immunology, article ID 530491

[24] Matteo M, Greco P, Levi Setti PE, Morenghi E, De Rosario F, Massenzio F, Albani E, Totaro P, Liso A.  2013  Preliminary evidence for high anti-PLAC1 antibody levels in infertile patients with repeated unexplained implantation failure. Placenta. Apr;34(4):335-9. doi: 10.1016/j.placenta.2013.01.006. 

[25] Shi LY, Ma Y, Zhu GY, Liu JW, Zhou CX, Chen LJ, Wang Y, Li RC, Yang ZX, Zhang D.  2018 Placenta-specific 1 regulates oocyte meiosis and fertilization through furin. FASEB J. Oct;32(10):5483-5494. doi: 10.1096/fj.201700922RR. 

[26] Yilmaz N, Timur H, Ugurlu EN, Yilmaz S, Ozgu-Erdinc AS, Erkilinc S, Inal HA.  2020   Placenta specific protein-1 in recurrent pregnancy loss and in In Vitro Fertilisation failure: a prospective observational case-control study. J Obstet Gynaecol. Aug;40(6):843-848. doi: 10.1080/01443615.2019.1674263. 

[27] Fujito N, Samura O, Miharu N, Tanigawa M, Hyodo M, Kudo Y.  2006 Increased plasma mRNAs of placenta-specific 1 (PLAC1) and glial cells-missing 1 (GCM1) in mothers with pre-eclampsia. Hiroshima J Med Sci. Mar;55(1):9-15. 

[28] Purwosunu Y, Sekizawa A, Farina A, Wibowo N, Okazaki S, Nakamura M, Samura O, Fujito N, Okai T.  2007  Cell-free mRNA concentrations of CRH, PLAC1, and selectin-P are increased in the plasma of pregnant women with preeclampsia. Prenat Diagn. Aug;27(8):772-7. 

[29] Kodama M, Miyoshi H, Fujito N, Samura O, Kudo Y.  2011 Plasma mRNA concentrations of placenta-specific 1 (PLAC1) and pregnancy associated plasma protein A (PAPP-A) are higher in early-onset than late-onset pre-eclampsia. J Obstet Gynaecol Res. Apr;37(4):313-8. doi: 10.1111/j.1447-0756.2010.01349.x. 

[30] Zanello M, Sekizawa A, Purwosunu Y, Curti A, Farina A.  2014  Circulating mRNA for the PLAC1 gene as a second trimester marker (14–18 weeks' gestation) in the screening for late preeclampsia. Fetal Diagn Ther. 36(3):196-201. doi: 10.1159/000360854. 

[31] Ibanoglu MC, Ozgu-Erdinc AS, Uygur D. 2018  Maternal placi protein levels in early- and late-onset preeclampsia. Ginekol Pol. 89(3):147-152. doi: 10.5603/GP.a2018.0025. 

[32] Wan L, Sun D, Xie J, Du M, Wang P, Wang M, Lei Y, Wang H, Wang H, Dong M.  2019  Declined placental PLAC1 expression is involved in preeclampsia. Medicine (Baltimore). 2019 Nov;98(44):e17676. doi: 10.1097/MD.0000000000017676.Medicine (Baltimore). 2019.

[33] Levine L, Habertheuer A, Ram C, Korutla L, Schwartz N, Hu RW, Reddy S, Freas A, Zielinski PD, Harmon J, Molugu SK, Parry S, Vallabhajosyula P.  2020  Syncytiotrophoblast extracellular microvesicle profiles in maternal circulation for noninvasive diagnosis of preeclampsia. Sci Rep. Apr 14;10(1):6398. doi: 10.1038/s41598-020-62193-7. Sci Rep. 2020. 

[34] Chen J, Pang XW, Liu FF, Dong XY, Wang HC, Wang S, Zhang Y, Chen WF.  2006  [PLAC1/CP1 gene expression and autologous humoral immunity in gastric cancer patients]. Beijing Da Xue Xue Bao Yi Xue Ban. Apr 18;38(2):124-7.  (In Chinese)

[35] Otsubo T, Akiyama Y, Hashimoto Y, Shimada S, Goto K, Yuasa Y.  2011  MicroRNA-126 inhibits SOX2 expression and contributes to gastric carcinogenesis. PLoS One. Jan 27;6(1):e16617. doi: 10.1371/journal.pone.0016617.PLoS One. 

[36] Liu W, Zhai M, Wu Z, Qi Y, Wu Y, Dai C, Sun M, Li L, Gao Y.  2012 Identification of a novel HLA-A2-restricted cytotoxic T lymphocyte epitope from cancer-testis antigen PLAC1 in breast cancer. Amino Acids. Jun;42(6):2257-65. doi: 10.1007/s00726-011-0966-3. 

[37] Liu FF, Shen DH, Wang S, Ye YJ, Song QJ. 2010  [Expression of PLAC1/CP1 genes in primary colorectal carcinoma and its clinical significance]. Zhonghua Bing Li Xue Za Zhi. 2010 Dec;39(12):810-3.  Chinese.

[38] Liu F, Zhang H, Shen D, Wang S, Ye Y, Chen H, Pang X, Song Q, He P.  2014 Identification of two new HLA-A*0201-restricted cytotoxic T lymphocyte epitopes from colorectal carcinoma-associated antigen PLAC1/CP1. J Gastroenterol. Mar;49(3):419-26. doi:  0.1007/s00535-013-0811-4. 

[39] Liu F, Shen D, Kang X, Zhang C, Song Q. 2015  New tumour antigen PLAC1/CP1, a potentially useful prognostic marker and immunotherapy target for gastric adenocarcinoma. J Clin Pathol. Nov;68(11):913-6. doi: 10.1136/jclinpath-2015-202978. 

[40] Guo L, Xu D, Lu Y, Peng J, Jiang L. 2017  Detection of circulating tumor cells by reverse transcription‑quantitative polymerase chain reaction and magnetic activated cell sorting in the peripheral blood of patients with hepatocellular carcinoma. Mol Med Rep. Nov;16(5):5894-5900. doi: 10.3892/mmr.2017.7372. 

[41] Wu Y, Lin X, Di X, Chen Y, Zhao H, Wang X. 2017  Oncogenic function of Plac1 on the proliferation and metastasis in hepatocellular carcinoma cells. Oncol Rep. Jan;37(1):465-473. doi: 10.3892/or.2016.5272. 

[42] Yin Y, Zhu X, Huang S, Zheng J, Zhang M, Kong W, Chen Q, Zhang Y, Chen X, Lin K, Ouyang X.  2017  Expression and clinical significance of placenta-specific 1 in pancreatic ductal adenocarcinoma. Tumour Biol. Jun;39(6):1010428317699131. doi: 10.1177/1010428317699131.Tumour Biol. 2017. 

[43] Yang L, Zha TQ, He X, Chen L, Zhu Q, Wu WB, Nie FQ, Wang Q, Zang CS, Zhang ML, He J, Li W, Jiang W, Lu KH.  2018  Placenta-specific protein 1 promotes cell proliferation and invasion in non-small cell lung cancer. Oncol Rep. Jan;39(1):53-60. doi: 10.3892/or.2017.6086. 

[44] Koslowski M, Sahin U, Mitnacht-Kraus R, Seitz G, Huber C, Türeci O.  2007  A placenta-specific gene ectopically activated in many human cancers is essentially involved in malignant cell processes. Cancer Res. Oct 1;67(19):9528-34.

[45] Koslowski M, Türeci O, Biesterfeld S, Seitz G, Huber C, Sahin U.  2009 Selective activation of trophoblast-specific PLAC1 in breast cancer by CCAAT/enhancer-binding protein beta (C/EBPbeta) isoform 2. J Biol Chem. Oct 16;284(42):28607-15. doi: 10.1074/jbc.M109.031120. 

[46] Wagner M, Koslowski M, Paret C, Schmidt M, Türeci O, Sahin U.  2013 NCOA3 is a selective co-activator of estrogen receptor α-mediated transactivation of PLAC1 in MCF-7 breast cancer cells. BMC Cancer. Dec 4;13:570. doi: 10.1186/1471-2407-13-570. 

[47] Li Q, Liu M, Wu M, Zhou X, Wang S, Hu Y, Wang Y, He Y, Zeng X, Chen J, Liu Q, Xiao D, Hu X, Liu W.  2018  PLAC1-specific TCR-engineered T cells mediate antigen-specific antitumor effects in breast cancer. Oncol Lett. Apr;15(4):5924-5932. doi: 10.3892/ol.2018.8075. 

[48] Li Y, Chu J, Li J, Feng W, Yang F, Wang Y, Zhang Y, Sun C, Yang M, Vasilatos SN, Huang Y, Fu Z, Yin Y. 2018  Cancer/testis antigen-Plac1 promotes invasion and metastasis of breast cancer through Furin/NICD/PTEN signaling pathway.

Mol Oncol. Aug;12(8):1233-1248. doi: 10.1002/1878-0261.12311. 

[49] Yuan H, Chen V, Boisvert M, Isaacs C, Glazer RI. 2018  PLAC1 as a serum biomarker for breast cancer. PLoS One. Feb 12;13(2):e0192106. doi: 10.1371/journal.pone.0192106. eCollection 2018.PLoS One. 2018. 

[50] Ghods R, Ghahremani MH, Madjd Z, Asgari M, Abolhasani M, Tavasoli S, Mahmoudi AR, Darzi M, Pasalar P, Jeddi-Tehrani M, Zarnani AH.  2014  High placenta-specific 1/low prostate-specific antigen expression pattern in high-grade prostate adenocarcinoma. Cancer Immunol Immunother. Dec;63(12):1319-27. doi: 10.1007/s00262-014-1594-z. 

[51] Nejadmoghaddam MR, Zarnani AH, Ghahremanzadeh R, Ghods R, Mahmoudian J, Yousefi M, Nazari M, Ghahremani MH, Abolhasani M, Anissian A, Mahmoudi M, Dinarvand R.  2017 Placenta-specific1 (PLAC1) is a potential target for antibody-drug conjugate-based prostate cancer immunotherapy. Sci Rep. Oct 17;7(1):13373. doi: 10.1038/s41598-017-13682-9. 

[52] Devor EJ, Leslie KK.  2013  The oncoplacental gene placenta-specific protein 1 is highly expressed in endometrial tumors and cell lines. Obstet Gynecol Int. 2013:807849. doi: 10.1155/2013/807849. 

[53] Tchabo NE, Mhawech-Fauceglia P, Caballero OL, Villella J, Beck AF, Miliotto AJ, Liao J, Andrews C, Lele S, Old LJ, Odunsi K. 2009  Expression and serum immunoreactivity of developmentally restricted differentiation antigens in epithelial ovarian cancer. Cancer Immun. 2009 Aug 26;9:6.

[54] Devor EJ, Gonzalez-Bosquet J, Warrier A, Reyes HD, Ibik NV, Schickling BM, Newtson A, Goodheart MJ, Leslie KK. 2017  p53 mutation status is a primary determinant of placenta-specific protein 1 expression in serous ovarian cancers. Int J Oncol. May;50(5):1721-1728. doi: 10.3892/ijo.2017.3931. 

[55] Devor EJ, Reyes HD, Gonzalez-Bosquet J, Warrier A, Kenzie SA, Ibik NV, Miller MD, Schickling BM, Goodheart MJ, Thiel KW, Leslie KK.  2017  Placenta-Specific Protein 1 Expression in Human Papillomavirus 16/18-Positive Cervical Cancers Is Associated With Tumor Histology. Int J Gynecol Cancer. May;27(4):784-790. doi: 10.1097/IGC.0000000000000957.Int J Gynecol Cancer. 2017. 

[56] Massabbal E, Parveen S, Weisoly DL, Nelson DM, Smith SD, Fant M.  2005  PLAC1 expression increases during trophoblast differentiation: evidence for regulatory interactions with the fibroblast growth factor-7 (FGF-7) axis. Mol Reprod Dev. Jul;71(3):299-304.

[57] Roldán DB, Grimmler M, Hartmann C, Hubich-Rau S, Beißert T, Paret C, Cagna G, Rohde C, Wöll S, Koslowski M, Türeci Ö, Sahin U.  2020  PLAC1 is essential for FGF7/FGFRIIIb-induced Akt-mediated cancer cell proliferation. Oncotarget. May 19;11(20):1862-1875. doi: 10.18632/oncotarget.27582. eCollection 2020 May 19.Oncotarget. 

[58] Chen Y, Schlessinger D, Nagaraja R  2013  T antigen transformation reveals Tp53/RB-dependent route to PLAC1 transcription activation in primary fibroblasts.. Oncogenesis. 2013 Sep 2;2:e67. doi: 10.1038/oncsis.2013.31. 

[59] Mahmoudian J, Nazari M, Ghods R, Jeddi-Tehrani M, Ostad SN, Ghahremani MH, Vafaei S, Amiri MM, Zarnani AH.  2020  Expression of Human Placenta-specific 1 (PLAC1) in CHO-K1 Cells. Avicenna J Med Biotechnol. 2020 Jan-Mar;12(1):24-31. 

[60] Further Edit By Sattwik Sarkar , Ramkrishnapally , Malda

External links 
placentomegaly

Further reading

Genetics
Amino acids
Human proteins